Nurlu is a commune in the Somme department in Hauts-de-France in northern France.

Geography

Population

Places of interest
 The church, rebuilt by local architect Louis Faille.
 The Mairie and school, also rebuilt by Faille
 The house of Louis Faille

See also
Communes of the Somme department

References

Communes of Somme (department)